Originally known as the Oklahoma Bat Caves National Wildlife Refuge, Ozark Plateau National Wildlife Refuge was established for the protection of endangered bats and their habitat. The refuge is made up of several parcels of land located in northeastern Oklahoma. These parcels contain numerous caves considered crucial for the bats' survival.

The endangered cave species include the Ozark big-eared bat (Corynorhinus townsendii ingens), gray bat (Myotis grisescens), Indiana bat (Myotis sodalis), and Ozark cavefish (Amblyopsis rosae)

To protect the fragile habitats provided by the caves and the forests surrounding them, this refuge is currently closed to the general public.

References
Refuge website 

National Wildlife Refuges in Oklahoma
Protected areas of the U.S. Interior Highlands
Protected areas of Adair County, Oklahoma
Protected areas of Cherokee County, Oklahoma
Protected areas of Delaware County, Oklahoma
Protected areas of Ottawa County, Oklahoma
Protected areas established in 1986
1986 establishments in Oklahoma